Viktória Mihályvári-Farkas (born 26 November 2003) is a Hungarian swimmer. She won a shared silver medal in the women's 400 metre individual medley event at the 2020 European Aquatics Championships, in Budapest, Hungary. She also competed in the women's 1500 metre freestyle event.

References

External links
 

2003 births
Living people
Hungarian female swimmers
Hungarian female freestyle swimmers
Swimmers from Budapest
Hungarian female medley swimmers
European Aquatics Championships medalists in swimming
Swimmers at the 2020 Summer Olympics
Olympic swimmers of Hungary
21st-century Hungarian women